Chikkakalya Narayanappa Ashwathnarayan (born 2 February 1969) is an Indian politician who is the current Minister of Electronics, Information Technology - Biotechnology, Science and Technology, Higher Education,  Skill Development,  Entrepreneurship and Livelihood in Government of Karnataka from 20 August 2019. He served as the 8th Deputy Chief Minister of Karnataka from 20 August 2019 to 26 July 2021. He is a Member of Karnataka Legislative Assembly representing the Bharatiya Janata Party (BJP) from the Malleshwaram constituency.

The positions he held include Convener of Doctors Cell - Bharatiya Janata Party and Founder President of Rajiv Gandhi University of Health Sciences, Bangalore. He was also the Vice President of Bharatiya Janata Party, Bangalore District, Senate Member of Bangalore University, Syndicate and Senate Member of Rajiv Gandhi University of Health Sciences Employees Association, Bangalore, and the Chairman of Committee for drafting statutes for A&B, C&D cadre of employees of Rajiv Gandhi University of Health Sciences, Bangalore.

On 20 August 2019 he was inducted as the Cabinet Minister in Bharatiya Janata Party Government led by Chief minister B. S. Yeddyurappa.

Personal life
Ashwathnarayan was born to T.K. Narayanappa and A.L. Padmamma on 2 February 1969 in Bangalore. He is married to Shruthi Ashwath, with whom he has a son and a daughter.

Medical career 
C N Ashwathnarayan achieved his MBBS degree from the Kasturba Medical College, Mangalore in 1995. He started Padmashree Charitable Trust and Shushrutha Group of Institutions, which are running a group of educational Institutions, which offer various courses in Paramedic, Management, Science and technology and Ayurvedic Medical Science.

Political career
C. N. Ashwathnarayan entered mainstream politics in 2004 by joining the BJP and contested from Malleshwaram (Vidhan Sabha constituency). In the year 2008, he again contested from the same constituency. He won the election to the state legislature with a huge margin against two-time MLA, M.R. Seetharam.

He was elevated to the level of Vice President of BJP, Bangalore District. The BJP candidate from Bangalore North constituency won by a large margin in the April 2009 general elections, and BJP candidates won in 6 of 7 wards in the 2010 Municipal corporation elections.

The 'Dhobi Ghat' in Malleswaram was set up in 2009 as the first modern dhobi ghat in both Bangalore and Karnataka. The initiative was spearheaded by Ashwath Narayan as the local MLA and supports the livelihood of 400 families and has now become a 'National Model'.

Anganwadi centres were set up at government Schools in Malleshwaram under the 'Montessori' model to provide the best learning experience for kids. As an MLA, a citizen-centric Complaint Redressal platform called 'Malleshwaram Sahay' was also launched.

Positions and representations
President Samskara Bharathi, Malleswaram
Vice-president, Bharatiya Janata Party, Bangalore
Convener, Doctors Cell, BJP, Karnataka
Syndicate & Senate Member, Rajiv Gandhi University of Health Sciences, Bangalore
Senate Member,	Bangalore University

Other positions held

Founder President, Rajiv Gandhi University of Health Sciences Employees Association, Bangalore since 2000
Chairman, Committee for drafting statutes for A&B, C&D cadre of employees of Rajiv Gandhi University of Health Sciences 2000–2002.

Controversy 
The opposition Karnataka Congress claimed that Ashwathnarayan's brother rigged and influenced the police sub-inspector recruitment scam using influence. He was accused of misusing power as he lodged a FIR against 17 teachers and the High Court of Karnataka had to quash the FIR.

References

External links

Deputy Chief Ministers of Karnataka
Living people
1960s births
Politicians from Bangalore
Bharatiya Janata Party politicians from Karnataka
Karnataka MLAs 2008–2013
Karnataka MLAs 2013–2018
Karnataka MLAs 2018–2023